Mir Abdul Rehman Khan Jamali (Urdu: میر عبدالرحمن خان جمالی) was a former Member of the National Assembly of Pakistan. He was the younger brother of the former Prime Minister of Pakistan, Zafarullah Khan Jamali. He was the nephew of Jafar Khan Jamali, an All-India Muslim League leader from Balochistan, who was involved in the Pakistan Movement. He was the uncle of Jan Mohammad Jamali, the current speaker of Balochistan Assembly.

Jamali had also been a member of the Senate from Balochistan. Twice he was elected as a member of the Provincial Assembly of Balochistan from PB-26 Jaffarabad.

References

Living people
1948 births